Burnishing may refer to:

 Burnishing (metal), plastic deformation of a surface due to sliding contact with another object
 Burnishing (pottery), pottery polishing treatment

See also